The Iranian Armed Forces, officially the Islamic Republic of Iran Armed Forces, are the combined military forces of Iran, comprising the Islamic Republic of Iran Army (Arteš), the Islamic Revolutionary Guard Corps (Sepâh) and the Law Enforcement Force (Police).

Iranian Armed Forces are the largest in the Middle East in terms of active troops. Iran's military forces are made up of approximately 610,000 active-duty personnel plus 350,000 reserve and trained personnel that can be mobilized when needed, bringing the country's military manpower to about 960,000 total personnel. These numbers do not include Law Enforcement Force or Basij.

Most of Iran's imported weapons consist of American systems purchased before the 1979 Islamic Revolution, with limited purchases from the Soviet Union in the 1990s following the Iran–Iraq War. However, the country has since then launched a robust domestic rearmament program, and its inventory has become increasingly indigenous. According to Iranian officials, most of the country's military hardware is domestically manufactured, and the country had already become an exporter of arms by the 2000s. Unable to import weapon systems from abroad due to international and U.S. sanctions, and suffering from an increasingly aging air force fleet, Iran has invested considerable funds into an ambitious ballistic and cruise missile program for long-range strike capability, and has manufactured different types of arms and munitions, including tanks, armoured vehicles and drones, as well as various naval assets and aerial defense systems.

Iran's ballistic missile and space program is an internationally hot political topic over which it has consistently refused to negotiate. Iranian authorities state that the country's missile program is not designed to deliver nuclear payloads, but used only for surgical strikes, and is therefore not relevant to any nuclear negotiations with the P5+1.

The Iranian drone program has also raised concerns across the Middle East and much of the Western world, especially with proliferation among Iranian-allied forces in the Middle East, as well as exports to countries hostile to the U.S. According to U.S. Central Command chief Gen. Kenneth McKenzie, the U.S is "for the first time since the Korean War operating without complete air superiority" due to threats posed by Iranian drones.

All branches of the armed forces fall under the command of the General Staff of the Iranian Armed Forces. The Ministry of Defense and Armed Forces Logistics is responsible for planning logistics and funding of the armed forces and is not involved with in-the-field military operational command. The commander-in-chief of the armed forces is the Supreme Leader.

History

After the coup in 1953, Iran began purchasing some weapons from Israel, the United States and other countries of the Western Bloc. Later on, Iran began establishing its own armaments industry; its efforts in this remained largely unrecognized internationally, until recently.

Following the Iranian revolution in 1979, deteriorating relations with the U.S. resulted in international sanctions led by the US, including an arms embargo being imposed on Iran.

Revolutionary Iran was taken by surprise by the Iraqi invasion that began the Iran–Iraq War of 1980–1988. During this conflict, there were several conflicts against the United States. From 1987, the United States Central Command sought to stop Iranian mine-laying vessels from blocking the international sea lanes through the Persian Gulf in Operation Prime Chance. The operation lasted until 1989. Simultaneously, the Iranian armed forces had to learn to maintain and keep operational, their large stocks of US-built equipment and weaponry without outside help, due to the American-led sanctions. However, Iran was able to obtain limited amounts of American-made armaments, when it was able to buy American spare parts and weaponry for its armed forces, during the Iran–Contra affair. At first, deliveries came via Israel and later, from the US.

The Iranian government established a five-year rearmament program in 1989 to replace worn-out weaponry from the Iran–Iraq War. Between 1989 and 1992, Iran spent $10 billion on arms, some of which were designed to prevent other states' naval vessels from accessing the sea, including marines and long-range Soviet planes capable of attacking aircraft carriers.

A former military-associated police force, the Iranian Gendarmerie, was merged with the National Police (Shahrbani) and Islamic Revolution Committees in 1990.

In 1991, the Iranian armed forces received a number of Iraqi military aircraft being evacuated from the Persian Gulf War of that year; most of which were incorporated into the Islamic Republic of Iran Air Force.

From 2003, there have been repeated US and British allegations that Iranian forces have been covertly involved in the Iraq War. In 2004, Iranian armed forces took Royal Navy personnel prisoner, on the Shatt al-Arab (Arvand Rud in Persian) river, between Iran and Iraq. They were released three days later following diplomatic discussions between the UK and Iran.

They were released thirteen days later.

According to Juan Cole, Iran has never launched an "aggressive war" in modern history, and its leadership adheres to a doctrine of "no first strike". The country's military budget is the lowest per capita in the Persian Gulf region besides the UAE.

Since 1979, there have been no foreign military bases present in Iran. According to Article 146 of the Iranian Constitution, the establishment of any foreign military base in the country is forbidden, even for peaceful purposes.

On 4 December 2011, an American RQ-170 Sentinel unmanned aerial vehicle (UAV) was captured by Iranian forces near the city of Kashmar in northeastern Iran.

In 2012, it was announced that Iran's Quds Force is operating inside Syria providing the government of Bashar al-Assad with intelligence and direction against rebel opposition.

In December 2012, Iran stated it had captured an American ScanEagle UAV that violated its airspace over the Persian Gulf. Iran later stated it had also captured two other ScanEagles.

In November 2015, Iranian special forces assisted in the rescue of a Russian pilot that was shot down by Turkey, over Syria.

In April 2016, Iran sent advisors from the 65th Airborne Special Forces Brigade to Syria in support of the government.

In 2016, Revolutionary Guard forces captured US Navy personnel when their boats entered Iranian territorial waters off the coast of Farsi Island in the Persian Gulf. They were released the next day following diplomatic discussions between the US and Iran.

In March 2021 state TV in Iran showed footage of a “missile city” armed with ballistic and cruise weapons described as "a new Revolutionary Guard base" along the Gulf coast.

Commanders

 Ayatollah Ali Khamenei (Supreme Leader of the Islamic Revolution and the Commander-in-Chief of the Armed Forces of the Islamic Republic, in )
 Brigadier General Mohammad-Reza Gharaei Ashtiani (Minister of Defence)
 Brigadier General Ahmad Vahidi (Minister of Interior)
 Major General Mohammad Bagheri (Commander of the General Staff of the Armed Forces, in )
 Brigadier General Aziz Nasirzadeh (Deputy commander of General Staff of the Armed Forces, in )
 Major General Yahya Rahim Safavi (Senior Military Advisor to the Leader of the Islamic Revolution)
 Islamic Republic of Iran Army
 Major General Abdolrahim Mousavi (Commander-in-Chief of the Army, in )
 Brigadier General Mohammad-Hossein Dadras (Deputy Commander in Chief of the Army)
 Rear admiral Habibollah Sayyari (Chief of the Army Joint Headquarters)
 Brigadier General Kioumars Heydari (Commander of the Army Ground Forces)
 Brigadier General Hamid Vahedi (Commander of the Air Force)
 Brigadier General Alireza Sabahifard (Commander of Air Defense Force)
 Rear admiral Shahram Irani (Commander of the Navy)
 IRGC
 Major General Hossein Salami (Commander-in-Chief of the IRGC, in )
 Rear admiral Ali Fadavi (Deputy Commander of the IRGC)
 Brigadier General Mohammad Reza Naqdi (Chief of the IRGC Joint Headquarters)
 Brigadier General Mohammad Pakpour (Commander of IRGC Ground Force)
 Brigadier General Amir Ali Hajizadeh (Commander of the IRGC Aerospace Force)
 Rear admiral Alireza Tangsiri (Commander of IRGC Navy)
 Brigadier General Esmail Qaani (Commander of Quds Force) 
 Brigadier General Gholamreza Soleimani (Commander of the Basij Resistance Force)
 Law Enforcement Force
 Brigadier General Hossein Ashtari (Commander-in-Chief of the General Command of the Law Enforcement, in )

Structure

 Military Office of the Supreme Leader
   General Staff of the Armed Forces
  Islamic Revolutionary Guard Corps (Sepah)
 Ground Force
 Basij
 Quds Force
 Aerospace Force
  Navy
  Islamic Republic of Iran Army (Artesh)
 Ground Force
 Air Defense
 Air Force
  Navy
   General Command of the Law Enforcement (Police)

 The Iranian regular military, or Islamic Republic of Iran Army, consists of the Islamic Republic of Iran Army Ground Forces, Islamic Republic of Iran Navy, Islamic Republic of Iran Air Force, and the Islamic Republic of Iran Air Defense Force. The regular armed forces have an estimated 398,000 personnel: the Islamic Republic of Iran Army Ground Forces with 350,000, of which 220,000 are conscripts; the Islamic Republic of Iran Navy with 18,000, and the Islamic Republic of Iran Air Force with 37,000 airmen. The Islamic Republic of Iran Air Defense Force is a branch split off from the IRIAF and has 15,000 personnel.
 The Islamic Revolutionary Guard Corps, or Revolutionary Guards, has an estimated 190,000 personnel in five branches: Its own Navy, Aerospace Force, and Ground Forces; and the Quds Force (special forces).
 The Basij is a paramilitary volunteer force controlled by the Islamic Revolutionary Guards. Its membership is a matter of controversy. Iranian sources claim a membership of 12.6 million, including women, of which perhaps 600,000 are combat capable. There are a claimed 2,500 battalions of which some are composed of full-time personnel.

Cyberwarfare

It has been reported that Iran is one of the five countries that has a cyber-army capable of conducting cyber-warfare operations. It has also been reported that Iran has immensely increased its cyberwarfare capability since the post presidential election un-rest. Furthermore, China has accused the United States of having initiated a cyber war against Iran through websites such as Twitter and YouTube in addition to employing a hacker brigade for the purpose of fomenting unrest in Iran. It has also been reported in early 2010 that two new garrisons for cyberwarfare have been established at Zanjan and Isfahan.

Nuclear program
Fifth major branch of IRGC Nuclear Command Corps and Nuclear Security and Protection Corps was incorporated publicly 16 March 2022.

Size

Budget

Iran's 2021 defense budget was estimated to be $25.0 billion by IISS.

Defense industry

Under the last Shah of Iran, Mohammad Reza Pahlavi, Iran's military industry was limited to assembly of foreign weapons. In the assembly lines that were put up by American firms, such as Bell, Litton and Northrop, Iranian workers put together a variety of helicopters, aircraft, guided missiles, electronic components and tanks.
In 1973, the Iran Electronics Industries (IEI) was established. The company was set up in a first attempt to organize the assembly and repair of foreign-delivered weapons. The Iranian Defense Industries Organization was the first to succeed in taking a step into what could be called a military industry by reverse engineering Soviet RPG-7, BM-21, and SAM-7 missiles in 1979.

Nevertheless, most of Iran's weapons before the Islamic revolution were imported from the United States and Europe. Between 1971 and 1975, the Shah went on a buying spree, ordering $8 billion in weapons from the United States alone. This alarmed the United States Congress, which strengthened a 1968 law on arms exports in 1976 and renamed it the Arms Export Control Act. Still, the United States continued to sell large amounts of weapons to Iran until the 1979 Islamic Revolution.

After the Islamic revolution, Iran found itself severely isolated and lacking technological expertise. Because of economic sanctions and a weapons embargo put on Iran by the United States, it was forced to rely on its domestic arms industry for weapons and spare parts, since there were very few countries willing to
do business with Iran.

The Islamic Revolutionary Guards were put in charge of creating what is today known as the Iranian military industry. Under their command, Iran's military industry was enormously expanded, and with the Ministry of Defense pouring investment into the missile industry, Iran soon accumulated a vast arsenal of missiles.
Since 1992, it has also produced its own tanks, armored personnel carriers, radar systems, guided missiles, marines, military vessels and fighter planes. Iran is also producing its own submarines.

In recent years, official announcements have highlighted the development of weapons such as the Fajr-3 (MIRV), Hoot, Kowsar, Fateh-110, Shahab-3 missile systems and a variety of unmanned aerial vehicles, at least one of which Israel claims has been used to spy on its territory.

On November 2, 2012, Iran's Brigadier General Hassan Seifi reported that the Iranian Army had achieved self-suffiency in producing military equipment, and that the abilities of Iranian scientists have enabled the country to make significant progress in this field. He was quoted saying, "Unlike Western countries which hide their new weapons and munitions from all, the Islamic Republic of Iran's Army is not afraid of displaying its latest military achievements and all countries must become aware of Iran's progress in producing weaponry."

UAV program
Iran has produced several unmanned aerial vehicle (UAV), which can be used for reconnaissance and combat operations. Iran has also  claimed to have downed, captured and later reverse-engineered US and Israeli drones. Iranian drones have seen extensive combat during the Syrian Civil War as well as by the Houthi movement during the Yemeni Civil War, mostly against Saudi targets. Some time after the beginning of Russia's invasion of Ukraine in 2022, the U.S reported that Iran was supplying Russia with military drones. Iran later confirmed the reports, though it denied the drones were meant to be used in the Ukraine war, and added that China was on the list of countries looking to import Iranian drones.

Ballistic missile program

On November 2, 2006, Iran fired unarmed missiles to begin 10 days of military simulations. Iranian state television reported "dozens of missiles were fired including Shahab-2 and Shahab-3 missiles. The missiles had ranges from 300 km to up to 2,000 km. Iranian experts have made some changes to Shahab-3 missiles installing cluster warheads in them with the capacity to carry 1,400 bombs." These launches came after some United States-led military exercises in the Persian Gulf on October 30, 2006, meant to train for blocking the transport of weapons of mass destruction.

Iran is also believed to have started the development of an ICBM/IRBM missile project, known as Ghadr-110 with a range of 3000 km; the program is believed to be a parallel of the advancement of a satellite launcher named IRIS. Iran also dedicated underground ballistic missile bases and silos. Older generation platforms, like the Shahab family, are slowly being phased out of service and replaced by newer generation ballistic missiles that emphasise accuracy and manoeuvrability over longer range, such as the Fateh and Sejjil families. By 2020, the U.S military command in the Middle East had assessed that Iran's missile forces, by far the largest and most diverse in the Middle East, have already achieved overmatch against their adversaries in the region.

Weapons of mass destruction

Iran started a major campaign to produce and stockpile chemical weapons after a truce was agreed with Iraq after 1980-88 Iran–Iraq War. However, Iran ratified the Chemical Weapons Convention in 1997. Iranian troops and civilians suffered tens of thousands of casualties from Iraqi chemical weapons during the 1980-88 Iran–Iraq War.

Even today, more than twenty-four years after the end of the Iran–Iraq War, about 30,000 Iranians are still suffering and dying from the effects of chemical weapons employed by Iraq during the war. The need to manage the treatment of such a large number of casualties has placed Iran's medical specialists in the forefront of the development of effective treatment regimens for chemical weapons victims, and particularly for those suffering from exposure to mustard gas.

Iran ratified the Biological Weapons Convention in 1973. Iran has advanced biological and genetic engineering research programs supporting an industry that produces vaccines for both domestic use and export.

Military aid

In 2013, Iran was reported to supply money, equipment, technological expertise and unmanned aerial vehicles (drones) to the Syrian government and Hezbollah during the Syrian civil war, and to the Iraqi government and its state-sponsored organizations the Popular Mobilization Forces, and Peshmerga during War on ISIL.

Equipment

See also

 List of Iranian two-star generals since 1979
 List of military equipment manufactured in Iran
 Equipment of the Iranian Army
 Current Iranian Navy vessels
 List of Iranian Air Force aircraft

Notes

References

Further reading

 
  Alain Rodier, French Centre for Research on Intelligence, January 2007 - Order of Battle, strategy, asymmetric warfare, intelligence services, state terrorism. Includes detailed order of battle for both regular army and Revolutionary Guard
 Anthony H. Cordesman, Iran's Military Forces in Transition: Conventional Threats and Weapons of Mass Destruction, Centre for Strategic and International Studies, 
 'Iranian exercise reveals flaws in air defences,' Jane's Defence Weekly, 9 December 2009
 Kaveh Farrokh, Iran at War: 1500–1988, Osprey Hardcover, released May 24, 2011; .

Military of Iran
Armed Forces of the Islamic Republic of Iran
Organisations under the direct control of the Supreme Leader of Iran